The 1895 South Carolina Gamecocks football team represented South Carolina College—now known as the University of South Carolina–as an independent during the 1895 college football season. South Carolina compiled a record of 2–1. This was the first winning season in program history.

Schedule

References

South Carolina
South Carolina Gamecocks football seasons
South Carolina Gamecocks football